Kamenz was a Kreis (district) in the north-east of Saxony, Germany. Neighboring districts were (from north clockwise) Oberspreewald-Lausitz, Spree-Neiße, Niederschlesischer Oberlausitzkreis, Bautzen - Budyšin, Sächsische Schweiz, the district-free city Dresden - Drježdźany, and the districts Meißen and Riesa-Großenhain. The district-free city Hoyerswerda was surrounded by the district.

History 
The district was formed in 1994 from the previous Kamenz district, the northern parts of the Dresden-Land district, around Radeberg, and the Hoyerswerda district, except the town of Hoyerswerda, which became a district-free city. From 1994 to 1996 it was called Westlausitz - Dresdner Land, but then renamed to Kamenz again. In August 2008, the Kamenz district and Hoyerswerda were merged into the district of Bautzen.

Geography 
The two major rivers in the district were the Spree and the Schwarze Elster (Black Elster).

Partnerships 
Since December 14, 1990 the district had a partnership with the district Alzey-Worms in Rhineland-Palatinate.

Coat of arms

Towns and municipalities

External links 
  (German)